Sheldon Clark High School (SCHS) was a public high school in unincorporated Martin County, Kentucky, USA, near Inez. It was a part of the Martin County School System.

It was named after Martin County Schools Superintendent Sheldon Clark when both Warfield High School and Inez High School was consolidated in 1972.  Martha Williams is the principal. The original Sheldon Clark High School building had to be abandoned after nearby road construction blasting resulted in structural damage, with the school then being housed in a middle school building until a new high school could be built. Construction of the new school, Martin County High School, started in 2016 with the school opening for the 2019–2020 school year.

Sports
American football
Baseball
Basketball
Cheerleading
Fishing
Golf
Soccer
Softball
Tennis
Track and field
Volleyball
Wrestling

Clubs
Academic team
Environmental club
Future Business Leaders of America
Fellowship of Christian Athletes
Family, Career and Community Leaders of America
Kentucky Junior Historical Society
Band
Jobs For America's Graduates 
Cardinal Broadcasting Network
Journalism
Junior Reserve Officers' Training Corps

References

External links
 Sheldon Clark High School-home
 http://schools.publicschoolsreport.com/Kentucky/Inez/SheldonClarkHighSchool.html

Public high schools in Kentucky
Schools in Martin County, Kentucky